Pyrotechnic stars are pellets of pyrotechnic composition which may contain metal powders, salts or other compounds that, when ignited, burn a certain color or make a certain spark effect. They are a part of all projectile-type fireworks.  The most common is the aerial shell. When watching this firework, it will launch into the sky, burning a lifting charge.  Once the shell has attained proper altitude, due to other mechanisms within the firework, it will ignite the stars.

Procedure
Stars are either rolled, pumped or cut.

Rolled stars are small cores of a hard material (often lead shot or an organic material such as mustard seeds or even cut stars) which are coated in a rotating mixer similar to a concrete mixer. First some water is sprayed on cores. Then an amount of a pyrotechnic composition is dropped into the mixer. These two steps are repeated, and the stars will grow bigger and bigger into a spherical shape.
Pumped stars are stars that have been pumped using a star pump. A dampened composition is put in the star pump and is pressed against a flat surface and ejected again, creating cylinder shaped stars.
Cut stars is a dampened composition spread out to an even layer on a flat surface. The stars are then cut into cubes.

The stars are allowed to dry for some days before being put into the fireworks piece.

Priming the stars is often necessary because they may be hard to ignite. Priming consists of coating the surface of the star with a more easily ignited substance, such as black powder.

Putting into use
Stars can be used in aerial shells, Roman candles, star mines, and certain bottle rockets. When used in aerial shells, the stars may sometimes be required to be "primed" with an ignition coating, consisting of a pyrotechnic mixture with an ignition temperature lower than that of the star. This is usually done if the star composition does not ignite easily.

Pyrotechnics
Pyrotechnic compositions